The String Lake Comfort Station is one of three similar buildings in Grand Teton National Park that were built by the Civilian Conservation Corps and the Public Works Administration to standard National Park Service plans.  Built between 1934 and 1939, the String Lake station was originally located near the Jenny Lake ranger station. It is an example of the National Park Service Rustic style.

The String Lake Comfort Station was listed on the National Register of Historic Places on April 23, 1990.

References

External links

String Lake Comfort Station at the Wyoming State Historic Preservation Office

National Park Service rustic in Wyoming
Buildings and structures in Grand Teton National Park
Civilian Conservation Corps in Wyoming
Restrooms in the United States
National Register of Historic Places in Grand Teton National Park
1939 establishments in Wyoming